Jean Cottereau was the royal treasurer to Louis XII of France. He rebuilt the old castle in Maintenon, transforming it into the Château de Maintenon. Later, it was remade into a fashionable country house for Madame de Maintenon, the second wife of Louis XIV.

Clément Marot's verse epitaphs, "De Messire Jean Cotereau, chevalier, seigneur de Maintenon", are included in his Cimitière (nos. viii, ix, and x).

References

Treasury officials
French civil servants